Albert Nikiforovich Tavkhelidze (16 December 1930  27 February 2010) was President of the Georgian National Academy of Sciences (19862005). Tavkhelidze was a Doctor of Physical and Mathematical Sciences, Professor, Academician of the Georgian National Academy of Sciences; and earned a Fellowship in the Russian Academy of Sciences.

References 

Members of the Georgian National Academy of Sciences
Soviet physicists
Full Members of the USSR Academy of Sciences
Full Members of the Russian Academy of Sciences
1930 births
2010 deaths
Burials in Troyekurovskoye Cemetery